Murray may refer to:

Businesses
 Murray (bicycle company), an American manufacturer of low-cost bicycles
 Murrays, an Australian bus company
 Murray International Trust, a Scottish investment trust
 D. & W. Murray Limited, an Australian wholesale drapery business
 John Murray (publishing house), a British publishing house

Fictional characters
Murray Monster, a muppet in Sesame Street
Little Murray Sparkles, a cat in Sesame Street
Murray (Monkey Island), a character in the video game series
Murray (Sly Cooper), a character in the video game series
Murray Slaughter, a regular character in The Mary Tyler Moore Show
Murray, the mascot of the band Dio
Murray, in the 2015 Netflix series Richie Rich
Murray, a Hotel Transylvania character
Murray the Cop, in Fat Pizza
Murray Smith, in Swift and Shift Couriers
Mrs Murray the teacher from Little Bill.

People 
Murray (surname)
Murray (given name)

Places

Australia
 Division of Murray, federal electoral district in Victoria
 Electoral district of The Murray, an electoral district in the Australian colony of Victoria from 1856 to 1877
 Murray, Queensland
 Murray Island, Queensland
 Murray River, a major river
 Murrays Road, Logan City, Queensland
 Murray Street, Perth, Western Australia

United States
 Murray, Connecticut
 Murray, Idaho
 Murray, Indiana
 Murray, Iowa
 Murray, Kentucky
 Murray State University, located in this city
 Murray State Racers, the school's athletic program
 Murray, Nebraska
 Murray, New York
 Murray, Utah, the largest city with the name in the United States
 Murray, West Virginia
 Murray Isle, in the Thousand Islands region of New York
 Murray Lake (Michigan)

Elsewhere or multi-national
 Murray County (disambiguation)
 Murray Island (disambiguation)
 Lake Murray (disambiguation)
 Murray Lake (Manitoba), Canada
 The Murray Marsh, Ontario, Canada
 Murray River (disambiguation)
 Murray Township (disambiguation)
 Murray Monolith, Mac.Robertson Land, Antarctica
 Murray Channel, between Navarino and Hoste Islands in Chile
 The Murray, East Kilbride, Scotland, a residential area of East Kilbride

Ships
 , two Royal Navy ships
 , three US Navy ships
 The Murray (clipper ship), an English clipper ship launched in 1861

Other uses
 Murray High School (disambiguation)
 Murray Building, a 1960s government building in Hong Kong, re-opened in 2018 as The Murray hotel
 Murray cod, a freshwater fish in Australia
 Murray polygon, a type of space-filling curve

See also
 Murray Hill (disambiguation)
 Murray House (disambiguation)
 Murray Park (disambiguation)
 Murray Town (disambiguation)
 McMurray (disambiguation)
 Moray (disambiguation)
 Murry (disambiguation)